Homogenia is a genus of parasitic flies in the family Tachinidae. There are about seven described species in Homogenia.

Species
These seven species belong to the genus Homogenia:
 Homogenia dysderci (Townsend, 1937)
 Homogenia inconstans (Wiedemann, 1830)
 Homogenia lacteata (Townsend, 1908)
 Homogenia latipennis Wulp, 1892
 Homogenia nigripennis (Bigot, 1876)
 Homogenia nigroscutellata Wulp, 1892
 Homogenia rufipes Wulp, 1892

References

Further reading

 
 
 
 

Tachinidae
Articles created by Qbugbot